This is a list of mayors or burgomasters of the City of Brussels.

Burgundian Netherlands (1384–1482)
1380: Geert Pipenpoy
1381: Geert Pipenpoy and Jacques Stovaert
1421: J. Swaeff, J. Cooman
1422: Walter Vanden Heetvelde, Petrus van Bolenbeke
1423: Guillaume de Kesterbeke, Jan van Muysen
1424: Jan van Coundeberg, called Rolibuc, Gielis Daneels,
1425: Willem van Herzele, J. de Schore, called de Briedere
1426: Wenceslas t'Serclaes, J. Rampaert
1427: Jean de Hertoghe, Michel de Mabeert
1428: H. Magnus, J. de Broeckhoven
1429: Willem van Kesterbeke, Daniel Poelbroot
1430: Simon van Ophem, J. de Schore, called de Briedere
1431: Walter, son of Gerard Pipenpoy, J. Roypens
1432: Wenceslas t'Serclaes, Félix de Hont
1433: J. Bernaige, H. de Beringen
1434: Jean de Frigidomonte
1435: Walter Vandernoot, J. Rampaert
1436: Walter Vanden Winckele, Arnout Wellems, said Van Almkercke
1437: Henri Taye, J. van Broeckhoven
1438: Everard t'Serarnts, Jean Ofhuys
1439: Jan de Mol, son of Jan, J. Bogaert
1440: Nicolaas Vanden Heetvelde, J. Rampaert
1441: Walter, son of Walter Vandernoot, Arnout Wellems, called Van Almkercke
1442: Jan de Frigidomonte, God. Taye
1443: J. t'Serclaes, J. de Schore
1444: Jan, son of Jan de Mol, Gerard Pipenpoy, died on 4 septembre; replaced by  J. Vanden Driessche
1445: Nicolaas Vanden Heetvelde, H. Vander Straeten, called Meeus
1446: Wenceslas T'Serclaes, Martin Wegsken, called Snellaert
1447: Antoine Mennen, Arnoul Wellems, called Van Almkercke
1448: Walter Vandernoot, Nicolas Vanden Driele
1449: Jean Vandernoot, Guill. Utenberge
1450: Nicolas Vanden Heetvelde, H. Vander Straeten
1451: Amelric Was, J. Cambier
1452: Everard T'Serarnts, Joos Westveling
1453: J. de Mol, J. de Blare
1454: Jan, son of Walter Vandernoot, J. Eggerix
1455: Thierry de Mol, Josse de Pape
1456: Amelric Was, Guill. Rampaert
1457: Walter Vanden Winckele, J. Cambier
1458: Philippe Van Nieuwenhove, Albertin Frenier
1459: Siger Vanden Heetvelde, J. Eggerix
1460: J. de Mol, J. Giellaert
1461: Amelric Was,
1462: Walter Vanden Winckele, Gerelin de Moor, called in den Sleutel
1463: Walter Vandernoot, Joos Westveling
1464: Petrus Pipenpoy, Willem de Smeth
1465: Jan Schat, J. de Poelke
1466: Everard t'Serclaes, Jan Offhuys
1467: H. Heenkenshoot, Adam Vandersleehagen
1468: Amelric Was, H. de Mol, dit Cooman
1469: Walter Vandernoot (lord of Risoir), J. Vander Moelen
1470: Antoon Thonys, J. Cambier
1471: Conrad Vander Neeren, J. de Poelke
1472: J. de Mol, Jacob Vanden Poele, called Poelman
1473: H. Heenkenshoot, Adam de Bogaerden, called Jordaens
1474: Nicolas Vanden Heetvelde, J. Ofhuys
1475: Costin de Limelette, Gerelin de Moor, called in den Sleutel
1476: J. Schat, J. Eeckaert
1477: J. Vander Meeren, Arnoul Vanden Plassche
1478: H. Vander Meeren
1479: H. t'Serarnts, God. Wyngaert
1480: Roland de Mol, Thierry Ruttens
1481: Wenceslas t'Serclaes, Petrus de Jonge

Habsburg Netherlands (1482–1581)
1482–1483: J. Bernsige, J. Mosselman
1483–1484: J. van Buyssegem, J. de Poelke
1484–1485: H. Vander Meeren
1485–1496: Roland de Mol, René Van Thienen
1486–1487: Pierre Was, Engelbert Vander Moelen
1487–1488: H. de Mol, Jacques de Ruwe
1488: Adriaan van Assche
1488: Willem T'Serclaes
1488–1489: J. de Heemvliet, J. de Walsche
1489–1490: Willem T'Serclaes, J. de Poelke
1490–1491: Hector Vandernoot, René Van Thienen
1491–1492: Jan van Catthem, Joos Zegers
1492–1493: Adriaan van Droogenbroeck, Petrus Goessens
1493–1494: Helegast Vander Meeren, J. Van Zennen
1494–1495: Jan Vander Meeren
1495–1496: Guill. Van Bitterswyck, J. Moyensoene
1496–1497: J. Vanden Heetvelde, Simon Van Doerne
1497–1498: Amelric Was, Jacques de Ruwe
1498–1499: Gielis Van Aelst, Pierre Goessens
1499: Wenceslas T'Serclaes, J. de Walssche
1525: Jan Van Nieuwenhove
1546: Jan de Locquenghien
1556: Jean Pipenpoy
1574–1576: Jacob Taye, lord of Gooik
1576–1577: Antoon Quarré, Petrus Cuyerman
1577–1578: Karel van  Brecht, Frans Jacobs
1578–1579: Leonard Vandenhecke, Willem de Smet
1579–1580: Jacob Taye, Simon de Sailly
1580–1581: Leonard Vandenhecke, Adriaan Van Conincxloo

Spanish and Austrian Netherlands (1581–1794)
1581–1585: Hendrik de Bloyere
1585–1586: Jacques Taye, J. Van Geersmeutere
1586–1588: Lancelot II Schets, 2nd Count of Grobbendonck, baron de Wesemale, J. Van Gersmeutere
1588–1590: Philippe de Rodoan, lord of Bergeghem
1590–1592: Hendrik van Dongelberghe, Gabriel Van Bemmel
1592–1594: Gielis de Busleyden, Willem de Vaddere
1594–1596: Henri de Dongelberghe, Arnold Addiers
1596–1598: François de Senft
1598–1599: Hendrik van Dongelberghe, Willem de Vaddere
1600–1601: Karel van Lathem, Gérard Mouton
1602: J. Duquesnoy, Lord van Steen
1603–1604: Hendrik van Dongelberghe, Arnold Addiers
1605: Karel van Lathem, Gérard Mouton
1606: Hendrik van Dongelberghe, Arnold Addiers
1607: Jacques Vandernoot, seigneur de Kiesekem, Gérard Mouton
1608–1609: Égide de Busleyden, Guillaume de Smet
1609: Charles de Lathem, Simon de Sailly
1610–1611: Hendrik van Dongelberghe, Arnold Addiers
1620: Englebert de Taye, baron of Wemmel.
1646: François de Dongelberghe
1688-1689: Henry Pipenpoy
1692: Henry Pipenpoy
1699: Charles-Léopold Fierlant
1700–1702: Roger-Wauthier van der Noot, 1st Baron of Carloo
1702–1707: Charles van den Berghen, comte de Limminghe
1707–1724: Jean Baptiste Aurelius Walhorn

French Republic (1794–1804)
1795–1800: Jean-Baptiste Verlooy
1800: Paul Arconati-Visconti, Marquess of Busto
1800–1803: Nicolas Rouppe
1803–1804: Henri Joseph Van Langenhoven

First French Empire (1804–1815)
1804-1805: Louis Devos
1805–1809: Charles de Mérode
1810–1814: Charles-Joseph, 4th Duke d'Ursel
1814-1815: Baron Joseph van der Linden d'Hooghvorst

Kingdom of the Netherlands (1815–1830)
1815–1817: Baron Louis de Wellens
1817-1820: Vicomte Hyacinthe van der Fosse
1820-1830: Baron Louis de Wellens

Kingdom of Belgium (1830–present)

See also
 Timeline of Brussels

Notes
Kwartieren.short notice
Letters of Anthonie Heinsius, 1702-1720.short notice
Vannoppen, Henri, Everberg, Le village des Princes. article
Site Ursel Family. article

External links
 The Mayors of Brussels

Mayors
Brussels
Mayors